The Hope Race or Hope Sled Dog Race is a defunct international sled dog race between Nome, Alaska and Anadyr, Russia, across the Bering Strait. The race was established in 1991, shortly after the fall of the Soviet Union, and according to information on the race's (now inactive) website, the race was run as recently as 2004.  Racers covered 1,200 miles, but did not actually race across the Bering Strait. Teams instead were shipped across the strait on boats and raced on land. In 1995, Alaska musher Bob Holder became the only person to compete in the Hope Race, Iditarod Trail Sled Dog Race, and Yukon Quest in the same year.

References

Dog sledding races
Recurring events disestablished in 2004
Recurring sporting events established in 1991
Sports competitions in Russia
Sports competitions in Alaska
1991 establishments in Alaska
1991 establishments in Russia
2004 disestablishments in Alaska
2004 disestablishments in Russia
Bering Strait